Suzana Ćirić (born 12 July 1969) is a Serbian long-distance runner. She competed in the women's marathon at the 1996 Summer Olympics.

References

1969 births
Living people
Athletes (track and field) at the 1992 Summer Olympics
Athletes (track and field) at the 1996 Summer Olympics
Serbian female long-distance runners
Serbian female marathon runners
Olympic athletes of Yugoslavia
Olympic athletes as Independent Olympic Participants
Universiade medalists in athletics (track and field)
Place of birth missing (living people)
Universiade silver medalists for Yugoslavia
Medalists at the 1991 Summer Universiade